La Salle College-Victorias (formerly University of St. La Salle-Vicmico) is a private school in Victorias, Negros Occidental, in the Philippines,  supervised by the University of St. La Salle.

References

External links
 Partial List of La Salle schools & educational institutions throughout the archipelago
 De La Salle Supervised Schools
 University of St. La Salle Supervised Schools

Universities and colleges in Negros Occidental